Warren City is a city in Gregg and Upshur counties in the U.S. state of Texas. The population was 319 at the 2020 U.S. census.

Geography

Warren City is located near the northern border of Gregg County at  (32.553516, –94.902389). The city limits extend north into Upshur County. It is bordered to the west by Gladewater and to the south and east by Clarksville City. It is in the area of the East Texas Oil Field.

Demographics

According to the census of 2000, there were 343 people, 119 households, and 98 families residing in the city. The population density was 194.0 people per square mile (74.8/km). There were 124 housing units at an average density of 70.1/sq mi (27.0/km). The racial makeup of the city was 89.50% White, 7.87% African American, and 2.62% from two or more races. Hispanic or Latino of any race were 3.21% of the population. By 2020, the U.S. Census Bureau reported a population of 319 people, with a continuing predominantly non-Hispanic white population.

In 2000, there were 119 households, out of which 37.8% had children under the age of 18 living with them, 67.2% were married couples living together, 10.9% had a female householder with no husband present, and 17.6% were non-families. 14.3% of all households were made up of individuals, and 10.1% had someone living alone who was 65 years of age or older. The average household size was 2.88 and the average family size was 3.20. In the city, the population was spread out, with 29.4% under the age of 18, 7.0% from 18 to 24, 25.9% from 25 to 44, 26.5% from 45 to 64, and 11.1% who were 65 years of age or older. The median age was 35 years. For every 100 females, there were 86.4 males. For every 100 females age 18 and over, there were 90.6 males.

The median income for a household in the city was $34,028, and the median income for a family was $37,500 in 2000. Males had a median income of $22,639 versus $24,750 for females. The per capita income for the city was $13,066. About 10.9% of families and 14.0% of the population were below the poverty line, including 16.3% of those under age 18 and 8.9% of those age 65 or over. In 2020, the American Community Survey estimated the median income increased to $61,250 with a mean income of $65,208.

Education
Warren City is served by the Gladewater Independent School District.

References

Cities in Gregg County, Texas
Cities in Texas
Cities in Upshur County, Texas
Longview metropolitan area, Texas